Peringgit is a satellite town of Malacca City and a mukim in Melaka Tengah District, Malacca, Malaysia.

Economy
 Lotus's Supermarket Peringgit

Education
 Peringgit National Primary School (Sekolah Kebangsaan Peringgit)

Tourist attractions

 Casa Cuba – A gallery which showcases various forms of art by Cuban artists, such as paintings, lithographs and ceramics. It was established in June 2007 as an initiative of the Cuban Embassy of Malaysia and is located in the residence of the former senior government officer of British Malaya.
 Macau Gallery, Malacca – Managed by Macau Government Tourist Office, Macau Gallery is a gallery set up by the Government of Malacca in collaboration with the Government of Macau to promote and exhibit the culture and arts of Macau. It occupies the building which has a total built up area of 3,000 m2 and is made up of Straits-themed tiles and Siamese architecture, initially built as a British colonial government office before World War II. Macau Gallery was first proposed by the Government of Malacca led by Mohd Ali Rustam, when the Chief Executive of Macau Edmund Ho paid an official visit to the state in 2007. After both governments agreed on a memorandum of understanding (MoU) for the management of the heritage building in 2009, the building was renovated and converted into the gallery today, which was opened on 26 June 2012. The gallery is divided into four exhibition zones across two floors, which are: Macau Events, Macau World Heritage, Maritime Routes and "Origins and Culture".
 Gallery of the Chief Minister of Malacca is a gallery which displays gifts, souvenirs, personal collections and biographies of the State's Chief Ministers. Its building was used as the official residence for the Chief Ministers from 1972 until 2006, when the new residence at the Seri Negeri complex in Ayer Keroh was completed.
 Tun Abdul Ghafar Baba Memorial – A memorial gallery that commemorates the life of former Deputy Prime Minister of Malaysia, Tun Ghafar Baba. The building was constructed in 1956 and served as Ghafar Baba's residence when he was the Chief Minister of Malacca from 1959–1967. In 2006, the building was converted into a memorial and was opened to the public. It is divided into two exhibition halls: the lower hall which displays most of his personal belongings during his reign as Chief Minister of Malacca, Minister and Deputy Prime Minister and the upper hall which displays his various souvenirs, photos, books, television set, furniture and fittings that he and his family used.

Transportation
 Melaka Sentral - Largest bus station in the state of Malacca.

Gallery

References

External links
 Peringgit Wikimedia Commons

Central Melaka District
Mukims of Malacca